Stink badgers, also known as false badgers are a genus (Mydaus) of the skunk family of carnivorans, the Mephitidae. They resemble the better-known members of the family Mustelidae also termed 'badgers' (which are themselves a polyphyletic group). There are only two extant species – the Palawan stink badger or pantot (M. marchei), and the Sunda stink badger or teledu (M. javanensis). They live only on the western islands of the Greater Sunda Islands: Sumatra, Java, Borneo in Indonesia, Malaysia and Brunei and (in the case of the Palawan stink badger) on the Philippine island of Palawan; as well as many other smaller islands in the region.

Stink badgers are named for their resemblance to other badgers and for the foul-smelling secretions that they expel from anal glands in self-defense (which is stronger in the Sunda species).

Stink badgers were traditionally thought to be related to Eurasian badgers in the subfamily Melinae of the weasel family of carnivorans (the Mustelidae), but recent DNA analysis indicates they share a more recent common ancestor with skunks, so experts have now placed them in the skunk family (the Mephitidae, which is the sister group of a clade composed of Mustelidae and Procyonidae, with the red panda also assigned to one of the sister clades). The two existing species are different enough from each other for the Palawan stink badger to be sometimes classified in its own genus, Suillotaxus.

References

Mephitidae
 
Carnivorans of Malaysia
Mammals of Brunei
Mammals of Indonesia
Mammals of the Philippines
Taxa named by Frédéric Cuvier